Belmont railway line may refer to:

Belmont railway line, New South Wales
Belmont railway line, Western Australia